St. Paul Roman Catholic Church in St. Paul, Oregon, United States, was the first church in Oregon to be built with bricks when it was constructed in 1846. It is the oldest brick building in the Pacific Northwest.  It was listed on the National Register of Historic Places in 1979.

Background
In 1836, French Canadian pioneers on the French Prairie in the Willamette Valley built a log cabin chapel along the Willamette River near the Methodist Mission. This structure was later moved to St. Paul and served as the church for the community until the current structure was built in 1846. After several requests for a religious leader by the French Canadians in the Willamette Valley beginning in 1834, and a second request in 1836, the Roman Catholic Church sent several priests including François Norbert Blanchet to Oregon Country. After receiving permission from the Hudson's Bay Company, Blanchet moved south of the Columbia River and gave the first Mass in the Willamette Valley on January 6, 1839. While preaching to the Catholic community at that church, Blanchet lived behind the altar. On December 11, 1843, Pope Gregory XVI created an apostolic vicarate out of Oregon with Blanchet as the archbishop.

New building
After the original log structure burned down, parishioners decided to replace the old church with a brick structure. On May 24, 1846, the cornerstone was laid on the new red-brick building. Upon completion, Blanchet dedicated the new church building on November 1, 1846.

See also 
 St. Paul's Mission, at Kettle Falls, Washington
 List of the oldest churches in the United States

References

External links

Parish information from St. Paul Parochial School
"St. Paul Catholic Church, Marion County" from the Oregon Historical Society

Roman Catholic churches completed in 1846
19th-century Episcopal church buildings
Roman Catholic Archdiocese of Portland in Oregon
Roman Catholic churches in Oregon
National Register of Historic Places in Marion County, Oregon
Churches on the National Register of Historic Places in Oregon
Churches in Marion County, Oregon
1836 establishments in Oregon
19th-century Roman Catholic church buildings in the United States